Tachina barbata is a species of fly in the genus Tachina of the family Tachinidae that is endemic to Tajikistan.

References

Insects described in 1980
Endemic fauna of Tajikistan
tadzhicadae